Pavlíček (feminine Pavlíčková) is a Czech surname. Notable people with the surname include:

 Michal Pavlíček (born 1956), Czech guitarist, composer, singer, lyricist, and writer
 Michaela Pavlíčková (born 1977), Czech basketball player
 Richard Pavlicek (born 1945), American bridge player, teacher, and writer
 Walter Pavlicek (1926–2004), Austrian swimmer

Czech-language surnames
Surnames from given names